LandmarkShops was an e-commerce website based out of Dubai, UAE. The site was launched as the online retail arm of the Landmark Group.

History 
LandmarkShops was launched in December 2012 as the group's venture into online retail.

Business, Brands and Features 
LandmarkShops allowed customer to shop for products from Babyshop, Splash, Home Center and Emax. The site incorporated Shukran, the Landmark Group's loyalty programme.

Categories 
As of September 2014, LandmarkShops offered over 30,000 products for sale across women and men's fashion, baby and child, toys and books, electronics, appliances and personal care categories.

Locations 
Landmarksshops was headquartered in Dubai and had logistics and operations across the UAE.

References 

Companies based in Dubai
Retail companies established in 2012
Emirati companies established in 2012
Internet properties established in 2012
Online clothing retailers of the United Arab Emirates